David Tibet (born David Michael Bunting; 5 March 1960) is an English poet and artist who founded the music group Current 93, of which he is the only full-time member.

He was given the name "Tibet" by Genesis P-Orridge, and in January 2005 he announced that he would revert to the name David Michael, although he continues to use the well-known "Tibet" in his public career to date.

Career
David Bunting was born in Batu Gajah, Perak, Malaysia. Early in his career, he collaborated with Psychic TV and 23 Skidoo. Tibet left Psychic TV in 1983 and founded Current 93 the same year. He has worked with Steven Stapleton of Nurse With Wound (of which band he is a member), Michael Cashmore, Douglas P. (of Death in June, on whose albums he has appeared several times), Steve Ignorant of Crass (using the name "Stephen Intelligent"), Boyd Rice, Little Annie, Björk, Nick Cave, Rose McDowall, Tiny Tim, Annabella Lwin (of Bow Wow Wow) and Ian Read of Fire and Ice. 

Tibet is part of a project called Nodding God, whose debut album, 'Play Wooden Child', was released in 2019. Tibet provided the vocals for this album, singing in the Akkadian language. Nodding God also features Andrew Liles, and an anonymous artist credited as the "Underage Shaitan Boy".

Related bands
Tibet's main musical outlet is the band Current 93, the only constant member of which is Tibet himself. 
Current 93's first release was the cassette-only Mi-Mort, a split C60 with Nurse With Wound. The first vinyl release was LAShTAL, with the line-up of Tibet, John Balance of Coil and Psychic TV and Fritz Haaman (Fritz Catlin) of 23 Skidoo.
Tibet often participated in making and producing several records by a number of industrial bands individually or in the name of Current 93. Those industrial bands include the Nurse With Wound, Coil, and some labels producing industrial noise music, such as Dark Vinyl. Among many important figures of the main line of industrial noise music, the network among David Tibet, Steven Stapleton and John Balance is an indispensable one. These people are proficient in various related musical styles from dark ambient to industrial noise music. They sometimes acquired knowledge from each other when working together, thus it is easy to see that in the music of David Tibet/Current 93, there are mainly two important genres of underground industrial music including ambient music and dark industrial. These mixed styles of music represents the development of the industrial noise music. At the same time, as David Tibet used to be a member of Death in June, which is a neo-folk band, the band Current 93 also has some works of neo-folk.

Influences
Tibet's mysticism is derived from such varied fields as religion, philosophy, witchcraft, poetry and painting. As his stage name suggests, he has Vajrayana Buddhist leanings, and regards the legendary tantric figure Padmasambhava as his own tutor. His album Buddhist Monks of the Maitri Vihar Monastery (1997) reflects his interest in Tibetan Buddhism. He also has longstanding interests in  Christian mysticism and esoteric Christianity, especially Christian eschatology, and his lyrical subject matter reflects a consistent preoccupation with such apocalyptic imagery as death, loss, and destruction.

Tibet has also been interested in the theories of twentieth-century occultist Aleister Crowley since he was ten years old, an influence apparent in many aspects of the covers, lyrics and themes of Current 93 (including the group's name itself). The initial recording of Current 93, LAShTAL, was, according to Tibet, "the invocation of Malkunofath on the Nightside of Eden, the reverse of the Tree of Life". Despite his continuing appreciation for Crowley as an individual, Tibet has since distanced himself from Crowleyanity. In April 2006, the Ordo Templi Orientis formed the International OTO Cabinet, an advisory, non-voting panel made up of both OTO Initiates and Non-Initiates. David Tibet was named among the initial non-member appointments. 

Other influences include Noddy, Gnosticism, Austin Osman Spare, Bobby Beausoleil, and a variety of occult topics.

Other activities
He is an established painter with much of his work in well-known galleries such as the Henry Boxer Gallery and Isis Gallery. Tibet's 'The Moons At Your Door,' an anthology of 'strange tales that influenced' Tibet illustrated by his own artwork, was released in Paperback Edition in March 2016. Tibet is interested in the work of Count Stenbock, whose writings he has worked to republish. He also ran the Durtro publishing imprint and record label (1988–2010) which has since been replaced by an earlier label, Coptic Cat, where many Durtro releases continue to be available. He attended Newcastle University.

References

Further reading
Keenan, David (2003) England's Hidden Reverse: a secret history of the esoteric underground, London: SAF Publishing.

External links
David Tibet's official website

1960 births
Living people
British poets
British artists
British industrial musicians
Alumni of Newcastle University
Outsider artists
British Christians
British folk singers
British male poets
Current 93 members
Death in June members